Associazione Calcio Petacciato is an Italian association football club located in Petacciato, Molise. It currently plays in the Eccellenza. Its colors are yellow and black. In the season 2006/07 the team gained the record for the worst performance in a national football championship: in fact it obtained the 18th place in Serie d with 5 points and no victories.

References

Association football clubs established in 1954
Football clubs in Molise
1954 establishments in Italy